Center Township is one of nine townships in Starke County, in the U.S. state of Indiana. As of the 2010 census, its population was 6,229 and it contained 2,650 housing units.

Geography

Cities, towns, villages
 Knox (the county seat)

Unincorporated towns
 Brems at 
 Indian Hill at 
 Toto at 
(This list is based on USGS data and may include former settlements.)

Adjacent townships
 Davis Township (north)
 Oregon Township (northeast)
 Washington Township (east)
 North Bend Township (southeast)
 California Township (south)
 Wayne Township (southwest)
 Jackson Township (west)

Cemeteries
The township contains these three cemeteries: Crown Hill, Oak Grove and Oak Park.

Major highways

Airports and landing strips
 Starke County Airport
 Wilson Airport

Landmarks
 Wythougan Park

School districts
 Knox Community School Corporation

Political districts
 Indiana's 2nd congressional district
 State House District 17
 State Senate District 5

References
 United States Census Bureau 2008 TIGER/Line Shapefiles
 United States Board on Geographic Names (GNIS)
 IndianaMap

External links
 Indiana Township Association
 United Township Association of Indiana

Townships in Starke County, Indiana
Townships in Indiana